Donald R. Taft (born November 1886 ) was an American criminologist. He contributed to modern criminal law, and wrote many books in the field of criminology. Criminology. A Cultural Interpretation. is one of them from 1950.

References

American criminologists
20th-century American non-fiction writers
1886 births
Year of death missing